Rogério Oliveira da Costa (10 May 1976 – 19 December 2006) was a Brazilian-born football striker. He was born in Foz do Iguaçu and became a naturalized Macedonian citizen.

Career
He played for FK Pobeda, FK Rabotnički, FK Vardar and FK Shkendija 79 in Macedonia, Royal Antwerp in Belgium, Trabzonspor and Vanspor in Turkey and PAS Giannina in Greece (2004-2006). He's the first Brazilian to play in the Macedonian league, which he played in Macedonia since 1997, and acquired Macedonian citizenship shortly before his death in Skopje of a heart attack at the age of 30.

In the 1998–99 season, while playing for FK Pobeda, he was the Macedonian First League top scorer with 22 goals, and was also awarded as the best foreign player of that season by the Macedonian Football Federation. By many football fans in Macedonia, he is regarded as the best foreign player ever to have played in Macedonia.

References

External links
uefa.com
Brazilian FA Database  
MacedonianFootball.com

Profile - FC Antwerp

1976 births
2006 deaths
People from Foz do Iguaçu
Brazilian emigrants to North Macedonia
Brazilian footballers
Brazilian expatriate footballers
Expatriate footballers in North Macedonia
Association football forwards
FK Pobeda players
FK Rabotnički players
FK Vardar players
Royal Antwerp F.C. players
PAS Giannina F.C. players
Expatriate footballers in Belgium
Trabzonspor footballers
Vanspor footballers
Expatriate footballers in Turkey
Macedonian people of Brazilian descent
Macedonian First Football League players
Sportspeople from Paraná (state)